The Women's keirin competition at the 2017 World Championships was held on 16 April 2017.

Results

First round
The first two riders in each heat qualified to the second round, all other riders advanced to the first round repechages.

Heat 1

Heat 2

Heat 3

Heat 4

 Q = qualified to Second round

First round repechage
The winner of each heat qualified to the second round.

Heat 1

Heat 2

Heat 3

Heat 4

 Q = qualified to Second round

Second round
The first three riders in each heat qualified to the final, all other riders advanced to final 7–12.

Heat 1

Heat 2

Finals
The finals were started at 15:39.

Small final

Final

References

Women's keirin
UCI Track Cycling World Championships – Women's keirin